Woosung is an unincorporated community in Ogle County, Illinois, U.S., and is located in the far southwestern part of the county, northwest of Dixon.

Woosung was named by a railroad official who had once visited Wusong, China during his former career as a sea captain.

Notes

External links
Woosung Community Profile

Unincorporated communities in Ogle County, Illinois
Unincorporated communities in Illinois
Populated places established in 1855
1855 establishments in Illinois